The Consul of Bordeaux is a 2012 Portuguese biographical historical drama film directed by Francisco Manso and João Correa and starring Vítor Norte as Aristides de Sousa Mendes. It was released on 8 November 2012. The film was shot in Viana do Castelo and Bordeaux.

Cast
 Vítor Norte as Aristides de Sousa Mendes
 Carlos Paulo as Chaim Kruger
 Leonor Seixas
 Laura Soveral
 Pedro Cunha
 Joaquim Nicolau
 São José Correia
 Manuel de Blas 
 Miguel Borines

Reception

Critical response
Jorge Mourinha, on Público, gave the film a rating of one out of five stars.

Accolades

References

External links

2012 biographical drama films
2012 films
2010s historical drama films
Portuguese biographical drama films
Portuguese historical drama films
Films set in Bordeaux
2012 drama films
Films directed by Francisco Manso
2010s Portuguese-language films